Gilbert "Danny" McNamee (born 29 September 1960) is a former electronic engineer from Crossmaglen, Northern Ireland, who was wrongly convicted in 1987 of conspiracy to cause explosions, including  the Provisional Irish Republican Army's (IRA) Hyde Park bombing on 20 July 1982.

McNamee was arrested on 16 August 1986 at his home in Crossmaglen by the British Army and Royal Ulster Constabulary, then flown to London and charged with conspiracy to cause explosions. At his trial at the Old Bailey, he denied even having sympathy for the IRA, and no evidence was ever presented that he had any paramilitary links. Additionally, the IRA itself stated that he was not a member, and never claimed him as a "prisoner of war". However, his fingerprint was found on electronic circuits in an arms cache that was linked to the Hyde Park bombing. At his trial, he explained that he may have handled the circuits when working for a previous employer, who he did not know had IRA connections. After five hours of deliberation by the jury, McNamee was found guilty on all charges and sentenced to 25 years in prison.

In September 1994, McNamee and Paul Magee were among six prisoners who escaped from Whitemoor Prison, shooting and wounding a prison officer as they did so, before being captured two hours later.

In 1997, his case was examined by Channel 4's Trial and Error programme. McNamee was later to be the first case referred to the Court of Appeal by the Criminal Cases Review Commission, and his conviction was overturned on 17 December 1998, because of other, much more prominent, fingerprints on the same circuits, belonging to known IRA bomb-maker Dessie Ellis (who received a ten-year sentence in Ireland for possession of explosives after the bombings, but before MacNamee's trial), which were not disclosed at McNamee's original trial. Despite quashing McNamee's conviction, the appeal judges stated, "The Crown makes a strong case that the appellant [McNamee] was guilty of a conspiracy to cause explosions." Supporters of the campaign to clear his name included the comedian Jeremy Hardy.

In February 1999, McNamee read the IRA Roll of Honour at the Burns and Moley commemoration and the following month he sat with the Caraher family during the trial of Michael Caraher and other members of the Provisional IRA South Armagh Brigade sniper team.

References

1960 births
Living people
People from Crossmaglen
Overturned convictions in the United Kingdom